The Technological Institute of Textile and Sciences (TITS) is an Indian technical college. It offers engineering and postgraduate programs. It is one of the oldest colleges in India.

The institute provides lectures by in-house and visiting faculty, discussions, seminars, project assignments and visits to industrial and project sites. The institute is attached to a textile factory where students train under actual mill conditions and working environments. Students undergo extensive practical and theoretical training. They learn to handle mechanical and administrative issues independently. TIT&S graduates are readily accepted by the textile industry.

Administration 
Its administration vests in the TIT&S College Managing Committee. The committee is constituted according to the constitution prescribed by the All India Council for Technical Education.

The college prides itself to be among the Top Musadies.

The college has its own Oscar rated Aarti "Land Mand Bhrmand" which every student has to remember by heart.

The institute is attached to a textile mill to train students under actual working conditions and for conducting research. The college's focus on textile technology is unique in India and uncommon elsewhere. It is among the few (others being the National Institutes of Technology (National Institutes of Technology NIT) and Indian Institute of Technology) in India that offers degrees in technology (BTech with Honours) at the undergraduate level as opposed to a B.E. (Bachelor in Engineering).

The Institute is NAAC accredited with B++ Grade and is approved under Section 2(f) and 12 (B) of UGC Act 1956.

History 
The college was founded in 1943 by Padma Vibhushan, Dr. Ghanshyam Das Birla and Pushkar D Makharia under the auspices of the Birla Education Trust.

The college was initially affiliated with the Department of Industrial Training, Punjab, for a 3-year diploma course in spinning and weaving technology. TIT&S remained part of the Birla Education Trust until 31 March 1985. Thereafter, it separated from the trust as an independent society. It was registered under the West Bengal Societies Registration Act of 1961 known as "The Technological Institute of Textiles," which was formed to manage it. To reflect the expanded instructional facilities and new courses, it was renamed "The Technological Institute of Textile & Sciences".

Growth

 1943 – Diploma in textile manufacturing (DTM)
 1952 – BTech in textile technology
 1986 – BTech in computer engineering (CE)
 1999 – BTech in electronics and instrumentation (EI) and BTech in fashion and apparel engineering
 2004 – BTech in electronics and communication

Partner universities
 Textile Institute, Manchester, United Kingdom
 Technical University of Liberec, Liberec, Czech Republic
 The Woolmark, Australia
  University of Huddersfield, UK

Ranking
It is ranked 1st in Haryana, first in North India and 1st on the list of the top 10 engineering colleges in India by the Hindustan Times, 16 June 2010.

Academics

Undergraduate Programmes
Bachelor of Technology in Computer Engineering
Bachelor of Technology in Electronics and Communication Engineering
Bachelor of Technology in Fashion and Apparel Engineering
Bachelor of Technology in Mechanical Engineering
Bachelor of Technology in Textile Chemistry
Bachelor of Technology in Textile Technology
Bachelor of Business Administration(BBA)

Postgraduate Programmes
Master of Business Administration
Master of Technology in Textile

Doctoral Programmes

The institute is an approved research center for doctoral courses (PhD).

Admissions
Admission to the four-year BTech course is based on merit of the JEE, the main exam conducted by CBSE; 400 students are accepted each year. MTech courses have an intake of 66 students and MBA courses have an intake of 40 students. Admission to the two-year MBA degree course is based on merit and determined by CMAT scores conducted by AICTE. Admission are made through 'On-Line Off-Campus' counseling under the authority of the Haryana State Counseling Board, Directorate of Technical Education, Haryana Chandigarh, for which TIT&S is a participating institute.

Campus

The campus covers  out of which 109,694 m2 is exclusive to the institute. The institute's main building has an auditorium. Other facilities include laboratories, men's and women's hostels, staff quarters and a playground. The three libraries are the Textile Library, the MBA Library and the Central Library.

Location
The institute is located in Birla Colony, opposite the Bhiwani railway station. The town of Bhiwani has just over half a million people and lies on the railway line connecting Rewari, Bhatinda, Hisar, Jaipur, Rohtak, Delhi, and Chandigarh. It is connected either by direct train or bus service to Delhi and all major towns of Haryana and surrounding states.

Hostels
Four hostels for men and one hostel for women are available, totaling 500 single rooms with a dining hall and a cafeteria. A vegetarian hostel cafeteria is run by the students.

The hostel has an alumni home for graduates, a VIP guest house and guest housing for other guests and parents of students. The hostel has a large recreation area for students with sports facilities for indoor and outdoor games, such as cricket, hockey, volleyball, basketball, football, and lawn tennis, badminton, table tennis, carom and chess.

Student life
Social Society: Two NSS units in the college work to understand and identify the needs and problems of the community. NSS student volunteers utilize their knowledge in finding practical solutions. During NSS camping, students acquire leadership skills and a democratic attitude.

The college leads the country in its growing Top Musadi Society.

Technical Society: Technical societies work to improve the student technical skills. They conduct seminars, workshops, quizzes and many other activities that help students to develop technical aptitudes. Major technical societies of the college include TIT&S Computer Society, Orators, OZONE, Voyagers, Maverick and Electronika.

The Orators Society: Orators is a breath of fresh air. Ever since its inception the society has focused on helping students develop various life skills essential to survive in the modern competitive world. Orators has carved a niche for itself by addressing the learner needs within the institute and outside as well through its outreach programmers. The members of Orators are dedicated individuals and are mentored to excel in their areas of responsibility.
The dedicated alumni of the society are always there to help the members of the society and guide them through the practical aspects of the corporate world. Orators boasts of a strong alumni network OAN which keeps the fraternity cemented. This society develops student communication skills. Activities include Extempore, group discussions, debates and declamations.

The Ozone Society: The society was originally started as a "Technical Society", now deals in every internal and external affair of the institute. It consists of the cream professionals, of the institute. Ranging from Technical Events to social events to fun events, this society holds expertise in every domain. It is the only society which organizes regular excursions for its members, recent excursion: Mussoorie ~ Oct,2019.

Dramatics Society: The society organizes cultural events such as Freshers Day, Farewell, Alumni Meet and Teacher's Day.

Recreational Society: The society circulates newspapers, magazines and other reading materials and screens movies and educational documentaries.

Students Council: The council is responsible for managing student activities and related affairs. Its leadership includes the chief prefect, chief captain, social secretary and underneath them, the heads of all the societies and the game captains.

Editorial Board: The editorial board, headed by the editor-in-chief, creates and distributes the campus newsletter and the annual college magazine Kriti and also organizes events to help students explore their creative side.

E-Learning: The institute started its e-Learning portal to aid teacher and student interaction. Web based meetings, quizzes and assignments, are available online and are available to non-TIT&S students.

Placements
The institute has had 100% campus placements in textiles and around 85% in all other branches from its inception. Textile companies visit campus and recruit students. Hiring companies include Vardhman, Arvind mills, Ashima mills, Voltas, Huntsman international, Trident Ltd., JCT, Dystar, Must garments, Nahar Fabrics, OCL, and Raymonds. From other fields, companies including Tech Mahindra, TCS, HCL, Infosys, Honeywell, Birlasoft, Quark and Oracle Financials recruit there.

School
Residential colonies around the institute and the factory need education for their children. TIT&S Society runs a Senior Secondary School for the children of its employees, which started as a Primary School. In 1952, the school moved to its present building which is equipped with laboratories and a library. From the initial enrollment of about 200 in 1946 it grew to over 2,400. It is the only school of its kind where education is free from nursery to senior secondary class. Free books are provided. The concept of 'Neighborhood Schools', which national planners are now advocating, has been in operation there since 1946.

Alumni
The largest alumni community is maintained by TITOBA on NET Portal, which is maintained by Rajesh Dudeja, (1986).

 TITOBA Alumni, TITOBA On NET, Global (more than 2000 TITians)
 TITOBA Alumni, Middle East

Notable alumni 

 Vikas Chopra – Senior Enterprise Architect, Aetna Inc.
 Deepika Narayan Bhardwaj – journalist, documentary film-maker and men's rights activist.

References

External links 
 TIT&S official website

Universities and colleges in Haryana
Engineering colleges in Haryana
Textile schools in India